Mose Rison (July 22, 1956 – September 7, 2022) was an American football player and coach He was the 20th head coach football coach at North Carolina Central University in Durham, North Carolina, serving from 2007 to 2010 and compiling a record of 16–22.

A native of Flint, Michigan, Rison played college football from 1974 to 1977 as a running back at Central Michigan University, rushing for 2,838 career yards. He died on September 7, 2022.

References

1956 births
2022 deaths
American football running backs
Arizona Wildcats football coaches
Central Michigan Chippewas football coaches
Central Michigan Chippewas football players
Davidson Wildcats football coaches
Livingstone Blue Bears football coaches
Navy Midshipmen football coaches
New York Jets coaches
North Carolina Central Eagles football coaches
Rutgers Scarlet Knights football coaches
Stanford Cardinal football coaches
Coaches of American football from Michigan
Players of American football from Flint, Michigan
African-American coaches of American football
African-American players of American football
20th-century African-American sportspeople
21st-century African-American sportspeople